Nijaz Ferhatović (born March 12, 1955 in Sarajevo, FPR Yugoslavia) is a retired Bosnian-Herzegovinian defender who played for SFR Yugoslavia.

International career
He made his debut for Yugoslavia in a November 1982 European Championship qualification match away against Bulgaria and earned a total of 2 caps, scoring no goals. His second and final international was another December 1982 European Championship qualification match against Wales.

References

External links

 Profile at Serbian federation site

1955 births
Living people
Footballers from Sarajevo
Association football defenders
Bosnia and Herzegovina footballers
Yugoslav footballers
Yugoslavia international footballers
FK Sarajevo players
FC Linz players
Yugoslav First League players
Austrian Football Bundesliga players
Yugoslav expatriate footballers
Expatriate footballers in Austria
Yugoslav expatriate sportspeople in Austria